Gemmuloborsonia moosai is a species of sea snail, a marine gastropod mollusk in the family Turridae.

Description
The length of the shell attains 32.6 mm, its diameter 9.8 mm. it is very similar to Gemmuloborsonia didyma

Distribution
This species occurs in the Arafura Sea, Indonesia and the Mozambique Channel.

References

External links
 Sysoev, Alexander, and Philippe Bouchet. "Taxonomic reevaluation of Gemmuloborsonia Shuto, 1989 (Gastropoda: Conoidea), with a description of new Recent deep-water species." Journal of Molluscan Studies 62.1 (1996): 75-87

moosai
Gastropods described in 1996